Goldsmith Fox Bailey (July 17, 1823 – May 8, 1862) was a U.S. Representative from Massachusetts.

Born in East Westmoreland, New Hampshire, when he was three years old, his widowed mother moved with him to Fitchburg.

Bailey attended the public schools of Fitchburg, Massachusetts. When he was 17 Bailey started work as an apprentice for the Bellows Falls Gazette. By 1844 Bailey became editor and publisher of the newspaper.

In 1845 Bailey began to study law, first with William C. Bradley in Westminster, Vermont and later with the firm of Torrey and Wood in Fitchburg.

Bailey was admitted to the bar in 1848 and commenced practice in Fitchburg, Massachusetts as a partner in the law firm of N. Wood & Co.

Bailey served on the Fitchburg, Massachusetts school committee from 1849 to 1854. He was appointed postmaster of Fitchburg on May 3, 1851 and served until May 4, 1853, when his successor was appointed.
Bailey served as member of the Massachusetts house of representatives in 1857. He served in the Massachusetts State Senate 1858–60. Bailey was the Republican Party candidate for congress in Massachusetts' ninth congressional district in the 1860 election.

Bailey was elected as a Republican to the Thirty-seventh Congress and served from March 4, 1861, until his death in Fitchburg, Massachusetts, May 8, 1862. He was interred in Laurel Hill Cemetery, with a cenotaph at the Congressional Cemetery.

See also
List of United States Congress members who died in office (1790–1899)

References

External links

1823 births
1862 deaths
Republican Party members of the Massachusetts House of Representatives
Republican Party Massachusetts state senators
Politicians from Fitchburg, Massachusetts
Republican Party members of the United States House of Representatives from Massachusetts
19th-century American politicians
People from Westmoreland, New Hampshire